Llandudno Rugby Football Club is a rugby union team from the town of Llandudno, North Wales. The club is a member of the Welsh Rugby Union and is a feeder club for the Scarlets. The team fields a first, seconds, youth and junior teams.

Llandudno RFC was established in 1952 when Liverpudlian, John Kidson, arrived in Llandudno and being a rugby union fan, was surprised to find the town had no team. Within a few months he had managed to gain enough local support and Llandudno RFC fielded a team for the 1952-53 season; though without a pitch the team played all matches away. The next year Conwy Football team disbanded and after some negotiation Llandudno were allowed to take over the Conway Morfa ground.

In 1957 a fire destroyed the changing rooms at the Morfa ground and the club were forced to move to a new pitch founded on the local Maesdu tip. In 1959 the club applied for and gained membership of the Welsh Rugby Union.

Club honours
North Wales cup  1999/2000

North Wales cup  2000/2001

North Wales trophy - 2008

References

Rugby clubs established in 1952
Welsh rugby union teams
Llandudno
Sport in Conwy County Borough